Murcian is a variant of Peninsular Spanish, spoken mainly in the autonomous community of Murcia and the adjacent comarcas of  Vega Baja del Segura and Alto Vinalopó in the province of Alicante (Valencia), the corridor of Almansa in Albacete (Castile-La Mancha). In a greater extent, it may also include some areas that were part of the former Kingdom of Murcia, such as southeastern Albacete (now part of Castile La Mancha) and parts of Jaén and Almería (now part of Andalusia).

The linguistic varieties of Murcian form a dialect continuum with Eastern Andalusian and Manchego Peninsular Spanish.

Murcian is considered a separate language of Spanish by some of its native speakers, who call it .

History 
Murcian emerged from the mixture of several linguistic varieties that joined together after the Kingdom of Murcia was conquered by the Crown of Aragon and the Crown of Castile and populated with principally northeastern settlers between the 13th and 14th centuries. The linguistic varieties were mainly Tudmir's Romance (a type of Andalusi Romance), Arabic, Aragonese, Old Castilian and Occitano-Catalan. In modern times Murcian has also been influenced by French and Caló.

Phonetic features of Murcian

Consonants 
No non-nasal consonants are permitted in word-final position. As is typical of Spanish, syllable-final nasals are neutralized, and assimilate to the place of articulation of a following consonant. In Murcian, as in many other varieties, the word-final nasal is typically realized as a velar  when not followed by a consonant.

Non-liquid, non-nasal postvocalic consonants in the syllable coda assimilate to both the place and the manner of articulation of the following consonant, producing a geminate. Other historical postvocalic clusters affected by this include , in each case producing a geminated second element:  (with  being an alternative to ). This produces minimal pairs differentiated by consonant length, such as cisne  'swan' vs. cine  'cinema'. This process also occurs across word boundaries, as in los nenes  'the kids'.

In casual speech, syllable- and word-final  is never pronounced as a sibilant .

In older working-class rural speech, syllable-final  surfaces as  before word-initial consonants (particularly the voiced plosives and ), as in los vasos  'the glasses'.  are lenited after this allophone.

Phonetic development 
There are linguistic phenomena characteristic of traditional Murcian speech, many of which are or were usual in other linguistic varieties (Aragonese, Mozarabic, Catalan, Andalusian, etc.):
This has been called .
 The frequent preservation of Latin group : , 'llamar' and also "pl".
 The frequent preservation of Latin group :  (llama, calor),  (llameante), etc.
 The presence of the intervocalic consonant cluster : , etc.

Vowels 

The vowel system of Murcian Spanish is essentially the same of Eastern Andalusian. 

Thus, the contrast between mañanas  and the singular form mañana  'morning' surfaces as a contrast of vowel quality: , rather than the presence of terminal  in the former word.

The close vowels have no contextual allophones, and they are consistently realized as close .

Other characteristics 

See also
 L’Ajuntaera pa la Plática, l'Esturrie y l'Escarculle la Llengua Murciana
 Language secessionism
 Spanish dialects

Notes

Bibliography 

 Alberto Sevilla. Vocabulario Murciano
 García Soriano. Vocabulario del Dialecto Murciano
 García Cotorruelo-Emilia. Estudio sobre el habla de Cartagena y su comarca.
 Molina Fernández, Patricio. Parablero Murciano.
 Muñoz Cortés-Manuel. El habla de la Huerta.
 Aguilar Gil, Pedro. Raíces, habla y costumbres de los huertanos. A.A.V.V. Torrealta. Molina. 1999.
 Álvar López, Manuel. Estudios sobre las hablas meridionales. Universidad de Granada. Granada. 2004.
 Álvar López, Manuel. Las hablas meridionales de España y su interés para la lingüística comparada. Atlas Lingüístico de Andalucía, Tomo 1, nº. 2. Universidad de Granada. Granada. 1956.
 Díez de Revenga, Francisco Javier y De Paco, Mariano. Historia de la literatura murciana. Editora Regional. Murcia. 1989.
 
 Ibarra Lario, Antonia. Materiales para el conocimiento del habla de Lorca y su comarca. Universidad de Murcia. Murcia. 1996.
 
 

Spanish dialects of Spain
Murcian culture